This is an annotated list of all the nuclear fission-based nuclear research reactors in the world, sorted by country, with operational status. Some "research" reactors were built for the purpose of producing material for nuclear weapons.

Algeria

Antarctica

Argentina

Australia

The main uses of the current OPAL reactor are:
 Irradiation of target materials to produce radioisotopes for medical and industrial applications
 Research in the fields of materials science and structural biology using neutron beams and its sophisticated suite of experimental equipment
 Analysis of minerals and samples using the neutron activation technique and the delay neutron activation technique
 Irradiation of silicon ingots in order to dope them with phosphorus and produce the basic material used in the manufacturing of semiconductor devices

Austria

Bangladesh

Belarus

Sosny, Minsk
 IRT research reactor (shut down 1988)
 "Pamir" - mobile nuclear power reactor test (shut down 1986)

Belgium

 BR-1 – 4MWt air-cooled, graphite moderated research reactor at SCK•CEN, Mol
 BR-2 – 125MWt water-cooled, beryllium moderated material testing research reactor at SCK•CEN, Mol
 BR-3 – 11MWe PWR reactor (shut down and fully decommissioned) at SCK•CEN, Mol
 VENUS – zero power critical facility, converted to GUINEVERE, at SCK•CEN, Mol
 GUINEVERE – fast, accelerator driven, lead-cooled reactor at SCK•CEN, Mol
 Thetis reactor – 250kWt pool type reactor (shut down and fully decommissioned) at Ghent university

Brazil

 IEA-R1 – 5MW open pool reactor, – IPEN-Instituto de Pesquisas Energéticas e Nucleares, São Paulo (criticality 1957-09-16)
 IPR-R1 – 250 kW TRIGA Mark I, – CDTN-Centro de Desenvolvimento de Tecnologia Nuclear, Belo Horizonte (criticality 1960-11-06)
 ARGONAUTA – 100 kW Argonaut class reactor,  – IEN-Instituto de Engenharia Nuclear, Rio de Janeiro (criticality 1965-02-20)
 IPEN/MB-01 – 0.1 kW Critical assembly, – IPEN-Instituto de Pesquisas Energéticas e Nucleares, São Paulo (criticality 1988-11-09)

Bulgaria

 Bulgarian Academy of Sciences (Sofia) – IRT-200 research reactor, partially decommissioned in 2009, shut down

Canada

Chile

 RECH 1 – Pool-type reactor, 5 MW MTR – Comisión Chilena de Energía Nuclear, Santiago (criticality 1974)
RECH 2 – Pool-type reactor, 10 MW MTR – Comisión Chilena de Energía Nuclear, Santiago (criticality 1977, refurbished 1989), currently in extended shutdown

China

 CEFR Chinese Experimental Fast Reactor (65 MW, 20 MWe, sodium cooled fast-spectrum neutron reactor). Located at CIAE Beijing, construction started May 2000, first criticality July 2010.

Colombia

 Bogotá – IAN-R1, 100 kW – TRIGA, Institute of Nuclear Science (installed in 1997)

Democratic Republic of the Congo

 TRICO I – TRIGA reactor, CREN-K (University of Kinshasa), 50 kW (initial criticality 1959, shut down 1970)
TRICO II – TRIGA reactor, CREN-K (University of Kinshasa), 1 MW (initial criticality 1972, extended shut down since 2004)

Czech Republic

 Řež – 2 research reactors (LVR-15 (a VVR-SM type reactor), LR-0)
 Prague – training reactor VR-1 at Czech Technical University

Denmark

 Risø – DR-3 DIDO class experimental reactor (shut down permanently in 2000)
 Risø – DR-2 experimental reactor (shut down in 1975)
 Risø – DR-1 experimental reactor (shut down permanently in 2001)

Egypt

Nuclear Research Center at Inshas:
 ETRR-1 – 2 MW LWR
 ETRR-2 – 22 MW reactor, built by Argentine INVAP

Estonia

 Paldiski – 2 PWR naval training reactors (dismantled)

Finland

 FiR 1 – TRIGA Mark II, VTT Technical Research Centre of Finland, Espoo (installed 1962, decommissioned 2015)

France

Shut down:

Zoé (EL1), the first French nuclear reactor (1948)
Eau lourde n°2 (EL2)
Aquilon
Eau lourde n°3 (EL3)
Rubéole
Mélusine
Proserpine
PEG
Alizé
Minerve
Triton
Néréide
Marius
Ulysse
Peggy
Rachel
Siloé
Pégase
Siloette
Prototype à terre (PAT)
Cesar
Marius
Harmonie
Osiris
Réacteur universitaire de Strasbourg (RUS)
Rhapsodie
Eau lourde n°4 (EL4)
Celestin I
Celestin II
Prospero
Caliban
Phénix
Silène
Chaufferie avancée prototype (Cap)
Phébus
Réacteur nouvelle génération (RNG)

Working:
Azur at Cadarache
Cabri at Cadarache
Eole at Cadarache
Isis at Saclay Nuclear Research Centre
Masurca at Cadarache
Réacteur à Haut Flux (RHF) at Institut Laue-Langevin, currently the world's most intense source of neutrons and the source of the most intense neutron flux
Minerve at Cadarache
Orphée at Saclay Nuclear Research Centre

Germany

 AKR II – Ausbildungskernreaktor II, Technische Universität Dresden; rating: 2 W, commissioned 2005
 AVR – Arbeitsgemeinschaft Versuchsreaktor, Forschungszentrum Jülich; rating: 15 MW, commissioned 1969; closed 1988
 BER II – Berliner-Experimentier-Reaktor II, Helmholtz-Zentrum Berlin für Materialien und Energie; rating: 10 MW, commissioned 1990, closed 2019
 FRG-1 (see GKSS Research Center) – Geesthacht; rating: 5 MW, commissioned 1958
 FRM II – Technische Universität München; rating: 20 MW, commissioned 2004
 FRMZ – TRIGA of the University of Mainz, Institute of Nuclear Chemistry; continuous rating: 0.10 MW, pulse rating for 30ms: 250 MW; commissioned 1965
 FR2 - Forschungsreaktor 2; rating: 44 MW; commissioned 1957; closed: 1981
 SUR-FW "Neutron"; Hochschule Furtwangen University; type Siemens-Unterrichtsreaktor SUR-100; rating: 0.1 W; commissioned 1973
 SUR-S; University of Stuttgart; type Siemens-Unterrichtsreaktor SUR-100; rating: 0.1 W; commissioned 1964
 SUR-U; Ulm University of Applied Sciences; type Siemens-Unterrichtsreaktor SUR-100; rating: 0.1 W; commissioned 1965

Planned
Wyhl, planned nuclear plant that was never built because of long-time resistance by the local population and environmentalists.

Greece

   (Temporary shutdown) GRR-1 – 5 MW research reactor at Demokritos National Centre for Scientific Research, Athens.

Hungary

Budapest
 Technical University of Budapest (BME) Institute of Nuclear Techniques – University Research Reactor (100 kW)
 KFKI Atomic Energy Research Institute (see KFKI ) – (10 MW VVR-SM Budapest Research Reactor)

India

Bhabha Atomic Research Center (BARC) – Trombay
 Apsara reactor – Asia's first nuclear reactor. 1 MW, pool type, light water moderated, enriched uranium fuel supplied by France
 CIRUS reactor – 40 MW, supplied by Canada, heavy water moderated, uses natural uranium fuel
 Dhruva reactor – 100 MW, heavy water moderated, uses natural uranium fuel
 Purnima series
Indira Gandhi Center for Atomic Research (IGCAR) – Kalpakkam
PFBR – 500MWe Sodium cooled fast breeder nuclear reactor, under construction. Expected completion 2015.
 FBTR – 40 MW Fast Breeder Test Reactor, uses mixed (plutonium and uranium) carbide fuel
 KAMINI –30 kW, uses U-233 fuel

Indonesia

 Bandung – TRIGA Mark II (250 kW installed 1965, 2MW installed 1997)
 Yogyakarta – TRIGA Mark II (100 kW installed 1979)
 Serpong, South Tangerang – SIWABESSY 30MWh Multi-Purpose Reactor (installed 1987)

Iran

 Tehran – AMF reactor at Tehran Nuclear Research Center (supplied by USA, 1967)
Isfahan, Nuclear Technology Center (mainly supplied by China,)
 MNSR – 27 kW Miniature Neutron Source Reactor
 Light Water Subcritical Reactor (LWSCR)
 Heavy Water Zero Power Reactor (HWZPR)
 Graphite Subcritical Reactor (GSCR)
Arak – IR-40 Heavy water-moderated reactor (under construction, planned commissioning 2014)

Iraq

IRT-5000 5 MW Destroyed in Operation Desert Storm and Operation Iraqi Liberation (Supplied by The Soviet Union.)
Tamuz-1 40 MW thermal tank-pool research reactor(OSIRIS reactor). Destroyed in Operation Scorch Sword and Operation Opera (Supplied, fueled and serviced by France.)
Tamuz-2 500 KW ISIS neutron modelling module. Destroyed in Operation Desert Storm and Operation Iraqi Liberation (Supplied, fueled and serviced by France.)
Tamuz-1 and Tamuz-2 are parts of the same French nuclear research complex design, the OSIRIS research complex. All three reactors were located at the same site.

Israel

 Negev Nuclear Research Center – EL-102 uranium/heavy water research reactor, 50-75 MWt (supplied by France, operational 1964, not under IAEA safeguards)
 Soreq Nuclear Research Center – 5 MW light water research reactor (supplied by USA, operational 1960)

Italy

 Brasimone (Bologna) – PEC (Prove Esperimenti Combustibile - Fuel Test Experiments): ENEA Ente Nazionale Energia Atomica - National Atomic Energy Agency - Brasimone Research Center (1972–1987)
 Ispra (Varese) – ISPRA-1 (5 MW): European Commission Joint Research Centre (1959–1973)
 Ispra (Varese) – ECO (Essai Critique ORGEL, 1 kW): European Commission Joint Research Centre (1966–1983)
 Ispra (Varese) – ESSOR (ESSai ORrganique eau lourde, 25MW): European Commission Joint Research Centre (1967–1983)
 Legnaro (Padova) - RTS-1: INFN Istituto Nazionale di Fisica Nucleare - National Institute for Nuclear Physic (1963–1980)
 Milan - L-54 (50 kW): CeSNEF Centro Studi Nucleari "Enrico Fermi" - Politecnico di Milano (1957–1979)
 Montecuccolino (Bologna) - RB-1 (zero-power reactor): University of Bologna (1962–1985)
 Montecuccolino (Bologna) - RB-2 (1 kW): University of Bologna (1964–1985)
 Montecuccolino (Bologna) - RB-3 - Aquilone 11 (1 kW): University of Bologna (1971–1989)
 Pavia – TRIGA LENA (TRIGA Mk.II model, 250 kW): University of Pavia (1965 - operational) 
 Palermo - AGN-201 "Costanza" (zero-power reactor): University of Palermo (1960 – operational) 
 Saluggia (Vercelli) - AVOGADRO RS-1 ("Swimming Pool" model): FIAT/Montecatini (1959–1971)
 San Piero a Grado (Pisa) – RTS-1 "Galileo Galilei" ("Swimming Pool" model, 5MW): CAMEN Centro Applicazioni Militari Energia Nucleare - Center for Military Applications of Nuclear Energy (1963–1980)
 Santa Maria di Galeria (Roma) – ROSPO-2 (2 kW): ENEA Ente Nazionale Energia Atomica - Casaccia Research Center (1960–1975)
 Santa Maria di Galeria (Roma) – TRIGA RC-1 (modified TRIGA Mk.II model, 1MW): ENEA Ente Nazionale Energia Atomica - Casaccia Research Center (1960–1987, reactivated 2010)
 Santa Maria di Galeria (Roma) – RC-4 RITMO (0.01 kW): ENEA Ente Nazionale Energia Atomica - Casaccia Research Center (1965–1978)
 Santa Maria di Galeria (Roma) – RANA (10 kW): ENEA Ente Nazionale Energia Atomica - Casaccia Research Center (1965–1981)
 Santa Maria di Galeria (Roma) – TAPIRO (modified Argonne Fast Source Reactor model, 5 kW): ENEA Ente Nazionale Energia Atomica - Casaccia Research Center (1971–1987, reactivated 2010)

Jamaica

 SLOWPOKE-2 reactor – Kingston, Jamaica

Japan

Japan Atomic Energy Agency (JAEA) Reactors

 Tōkai JRR-1 (Japan Research Unit No. 1, shut down)
 Tōkai JRR-2 (shut down)
 Tōkai JRR-3
 Tōkai JRR-4
 Tōkai JPDR (Japan Power Demonstration Reactor, shut down)
 Ōarai High-temperature engineering test reactor (HTTR)
 Ōarai JMTR (Japan Materials Testing Reactor)
 Naka JT-60 fusion reactor

 Nuclear Safety Research Reactor
 Fugen (ATR (Advanced Thermal Reactor), shut down)
 Jōyō (FBR)
 Monju (FBR)
Kinki University
 UTR-KINKI
Kyoto University
 KUR
Musashi Institute of Technology (Tokyo City University)
 MITRR (TRIGA-II) (shut down 1990)
Rikkyo University
 RUR (TRIGA-II) (shut down)
University of Tokyo
 Yayoi (shut down)

Jordan

Jordan University of Science and Technology (JUST) – Ar Ramtha
 Jordan Research and Training Reactor (JRTR) – Jordan's first nuclear reactor, 5 MW research reactor, supplied by South Korea, first critical 2015, operational 2016.

Kazakhstan

Alatau, Institute of Nuclear Physics of the National Nuclear Center
 VVR-K – 10 MWe reactor
Kurchatov, National Nuclear Center, Semipalatinsk Test Site
 IVG-1M – 60 MW reactor
 RA – zirconium hydride moderated reactor (dismantled)
 IGR (Impulse Graphite Reactor) – 50 MW reactor

Latvia

Salaspils, Nuclear Research Center
5 MWe research reactor (shut down)

Libya

 Tajura Nuclear Research Center, REWDRC (see ) – 10 MW research reactor (supplied by the USSR)

Malaysia

 Kuala Lumpur - TRIGA Mark II, Malaysian Institute of Nuclear Technology Research (installed 1982)

Mexico

 Mexico City - TRIGA Mark III, National Institute for Nuclear Research
 Mexico City - National Polytechnic Institute - "Nuclear-Chicago Modelo 9000" subcritical research reactor
 Zacatecas - Autonomous University of Zacatecas - Subcritical research reactor

Morocco

Rabat - TRIGA (under construction)

Netherlands

 Reactor Institute Delft, part of Delft University of Technology
 Petten High Flux Reactor in Petten
  Petten Low Flux Reactor in Petten, shut down in 2010
 Biologische Agrarische Reactor Nederland, part of Wageningen University, shut down in 1980
 ATHENE nuclear reactor, at the Eindhoven University of Technology, shut down in 1973
 KEMA Suspensie Test Reactor, test reactor at KEMA, Arnhem, disassembled 2003

North Korea

Yongbyon
 IRT-2000 - 8 MW (2 MW 1965–1974, 4 MW 1974–1986) heavy-water moderated research reactor (supplied by USSR, 1965)
 Yongbyon 1 - 5 MWe Magnox reactor, provides power and district heating (active 1987–1994, reactivated 2003, and shut-down in July 2007)

Norway

Kjeller reactors
 NORA (activated 1961, shut down 1967)
 JEEP I (activated 1951, shut down 1967)
 JEEP II (activated 1966, shut down 2018)
Halden Reactor
 HBWR - Halden boiling water reactor (activated 1958, shut down 2018)

Pakistan

Under IAEA safeguards

Not under IAEA safeguards

Panama

USS Sturgis - floating nuclear power plant for Panama Canal (operating 1966 to 1976)

Peru

 RP-0 - 1 W critical assembly, located in Lima, built by Argentine INVAP. First criticality in 1978.
 RP-10 - 10 MW pool-type material test reactor, located in Huarangal built by Argentine INVAP. First criticality in 1989.

Philippines
 PRR-1 - 3 MW TRIGA-converted reactor, Quezon City. Managed by the Philippine Nuclear Research Institute (formerly Philippine Atomic Energy Commission). 1st criticality in August 1963, reactor conversion in March 1984, criticality after conversion in April 1988, shut down since 1988 for pool repairs, on extended shutdown at present.

Poland

 Ewa reactor - 10 MW VVR-SM research reactor (dismantled in 1995)
 Maria reactor - 30 MW research reactor
 Anna reactor - 10 kW research reactor (dismantled)
 Agata reactor - 10 W zero-power research reactor (dismantled)
 Maryla reactor - 100 W zero-power research reactor (dismantled)
 UR-100 reactor - 100 kW training reactor (dismantled)

Portugal

 Sacavem - RPI, Portuguese Research Reactor - 1 MW pool type, Instituto Tecnológico e Nuclear

Puerto Rico

 Mayagüez - TRIGA reactor (dismantled)
 Boiling Nuclear Superheater (BONUS) Reactor Facility, BONUS - superheated BWR (decommissioned). Listed on the U.S. National Register of Historic Places.

Romania

 Institute for Nuclear Research, Mioveni, 110 km northwest of Bucharest - TRIGA reactor (capable consisting of either a 500 kW pulse ACPR core, or a 14 MW steady state core)
National Institute for Research and Isotopic Separation, Govora, 170 km west of Bucharest - no research reactors, but instead devoted to heavy water production
 National Institute for Physics and Nuclear Engineering, IFIN-HH, Mǎgurele, 5 km southwest of Bucharest - a 2 MW VVR-S research reactor (shut down in April 2002, with decommissioning/dismantling started in 2013)

Russia

A total of 98 nuclear research facilities, including:
 T-15 fusion reactor at Kurchatov Institute
 VVR-M 18 MW reactor at St. Petersburg Institute of Nuclear Physics
 IBR-2 2 MW pulsed reactor at Joint Institute for Nuclear Research
  SM, Arbus (ACT-1), MIR.M1, RBT-6, RBT-10 / 1, RBT-10 / 2, BOR-60 and VK-50 Research Institute of Atomic Reactors

Serbia

Vinca Nuclear Institute, Vinča
 RA - Reaktor A (1956–2002) - 6.5 MW heavy water moderated and cooled research reactor
RB - Reaktor B (1958-...) - At the very beginning the RB reactor was designed and constructed as an unreflected zero power heavy water - natural uranium critical assembly. First criticality was reached in April 1958. Later, the 2% enriched metal uranium fuel and 80% enriched UO2 fuel were obtained and used in the reactor core. Modifications of the reactor control, safety and dosimetry systems (1960, 1976, 1988) converted the RB critical assembly to a flexible heavy water reflected experimental reactor with 1 W nominal power, operable up to 50 W. Several coupled fast-thermal systems were designed and constructed at RB reactor in the early 1990s, for research in fast reactors physics.

Slovenia

 Ljubljana - 250 kW TRIGA Mark II research reactor (web page link), Jožef Stefan Institute (supplied in 1966 by the United States)

</noinclude>

South Africa

Pelindaba - Pelindaba Nuclear Research Center near Pretoria 
 SAFARI-1 20MW open pool reactor

South Korea

 Aerojet General Nucleonics Model 201 Research reactor
 High-Flux Advanced Neutron Application Reactor, MAPLE class reactor
 TRIGA General Atomics Mark II (TRIGA-Mark II) Research Reactor (decommissioned)
 TRIGA General Atomics Mark III (TRIGA-Mark III) Research Reactor (decommissioned)

Spain

 Argos 10 kW Argonaut reactor - Polytechnic University of Catalonia, Barcelona (shut down 1992)
 CORAL-I reactor

Sweden

Switzerland

 SAPHIR - Pool reactor. First criticality: 30 April 1957. Shut down 1993. Paul Scherrer Institut
 DIORIT - HW cooled and moderated. First criticality: 15 April 1960. Shut down 1977. Paul Scherrer Institut
 Proteus - Null-power reconfigurable reactor (graphite moderator/reflector). Shut down 2012. Paul Scherrer Institut
 Lucens - Prototype power reactor (GCHWR) 30 MWh/6 MWe. Shut down in 1969 after accident. Site decommissioned.
 AGN-211-P research reactor, in operation since 1958 (demonstrated at the Expo 58 in Brussels), since 1959 at the University of Basel. Decommissioned in 2020.
 CROCUS - Null-power light water reactor. In operation. École polytechnique fédérale de Lausanne

Syria

Miniature neutron source reactor

Taiwan

Hsinchu - TRIGA, National Tsing Hua University (installed 1958)

Thailand

 Thai Research Reactor 1/Modification 1 (TRR-1/M1) Thailand Institute of Nuclear Technology (TINT) Bangkok - TRIGA Mark III (installed 1962, modified 1975–77)
TRIGA MPR 10, Ongkharak Nuclear Research Center (under construction)

Turkey

 TR-1 Research Reactor (Turkish Atomic Energy Authority)
 TR-2 Research Reactor (Turkish Atomic Energy Authority)
 TRIGA MARK II Research Reactor (Istanbul Technical University) Institute of Energy

Fuel pilot plants
 TRD Fuel Pilot Plant (Turkish Atomic Energy Authority)

Ukraine

 Kyiv Institute for Nuclear Research
 Sevastopol Institute of Nuclear Energy and Industry

United Kingdom

 Aldermaston - VIPER - Atomic Weapons Establishment
 Ascot - CONSORT reactor, Imperial College London, Silwood Park campus. Began operation in 1965, shut down in 2012, fuel removed in 2014. Fully decommissioned by 2022.
 Billingham - TRIGA Mark I reactor, ICI Physics and Radioisotopes Dept of ICI R&D, Billingham (later to become Tracerco) (installed 1971, shut down 1988)
 Culham - JET fusion reactor
 Derby - Neptune - Rolls-Royce Marine Power Operations Ltd, Raynesway
Dounreay
The Shore Test Facility (STF) at VULCAN (Rolls-Royce Naval Marine)
DSMP1 at VULCAN (Rolls-Royce Naval Marine) (shut down 1984)
DMTR (shut down 1969)
Dounreay Fast Reactor - Fast breeder reactor (shut down 1977)
Prototype Fast Reactor (shut down 1994)
East Kilbride - Scottish Universities Research and Reactor Centre (100 kW Argonaut class reactor deactivated 1995, fully dismantled 2003)
Harwell AERE
GLEEP (shut down 1990)
BEPO (shut down 1968)
LIDO (shut down 1974)
DIDO (shut down 1990)
PLUTO (shut down 1990)
London
Greenwich - JASON 10 kW Argonaut class reactor (dismantled 1999)
Stratford Marsh - Queen Mary College (commissioned 1966, deactivated 1982, (fully dismantled))
Risley - Universities Research Reactor (shut down 1991 decommissioned-land released 1996)
Sellafield (named Windscale until 1971)
PILE 1 (shut down 1957 after Windscale fire)
PILE 2 (shut down 1957)
WAGR (shut down 1982)
Winfrith - Dorchester, Dorset, 9 reactors, shut down 1990
Dragon reactor

United States

Army Nuclear Power Program

United States Naval reactors

Research reactors

Civilian (private and university) research and test reactors licensed to operate

Civilian (private and university) research and test reactors formerly licensed to operate
Research and test reactors Under decommission order(s) or license amendment(s) are authorized to decontaminate and dismantle their facility to prepare for final survey and license termination. 
Research and test reactors with possession-only licenses are not authorized to operate the reactor, only to possess the nuclear material on-hand. They are permanently shut down.

See also
Integrated Nuclear Fuel Cycle Information System
List of commercial nuclear reactors
List of nuclear power stations
List of small modular reactor designs
Lists of nuclear disasters and radioactive incidents
Nuclear power by country

External links
DoE list
ICJT list—includes the defunct

Uruguay

 URR reactor - A small pool-type research reactor placed in Centro de Investigaciones Nucleares (CIN). In operation since the early 1970s up until 1997 when it was dismantled and returned to United States due to a 1997 law against use of nuclear energy in Uruguay.

Uzbekistan

 Ulugbek, Tashkent- WWR-SM tank reactor

Venezuela

 RV-1 nuclear reactor - 3MW pool-type reactor at Venezuelan Institute for Scientific Research (IVIC)  (criticality in 1960, shut down in 1994)

Vietnam

 Da Lat - TRIGA Mark II (supplied by USA 1963, shut down 1975, reactivated by USSR 1984)

Notes and references

Lists of buildings and structures
Reactors